Sharon Center is an unincorporated community in Medina County, Ohio, United States. It is centered at the intersection of Ohio state routes 94 and 162 in Sharon Township (see map at right.) This intersection is actually a large traffic circle with a park in the center containing a gazebo and several memorials to veterans of various wars.

History
The first settlement at Sharon Center was made in 1816.  A post office called Sharon Centre was established in 1833, and the name was changed to Sharon Center in 1893. The community is located near the geographical center of Sharon Township, hence the name.

Economy
In 2010, A. Schulman closed its manufacturing facility as a consequence of their acquisition of McCann Color.

Notable people
 Karen Archey, art critic and curator
Daryl Morey, general manager of the Houston Rockets

See also
 Highland Local School District
 Ohio State Route 162

References

Unincorporated communities in Medina County, Ohio
Unincorporated communities in Ohio